Belleville Transit is the public transit operator in Belleville, Ontario, Canada and is one of the services provided by the city's Engineering & Public Works Department. Buses operate between 5:00am and 10:30pm on Monday to Friday, with reduced service on the weekend; from 6:50am to 6:15pm on Saturday and 9:00am to 6:00pm on Sunday. There is no service on statutory holidays.

History 
The current Belleville Transit was created in 1960, taking over operations from Rawson Bus Lines who operated service in Belleville from 1920-1960

Services 
Belleville Transit operates 12 conventional routes

Route 1
Route 2
Route 3
Route 4
Route 5
Route 6
Route 7
Route 8
Route 9
Route 10
Route 31
Route 101

Fleet 
The fleet as of 2019 consists of 14 Nova Bus LFS and 3 specialized buses

See also

 Public transport in Canada

References

External links
 Belleville Transit Official Site
 Drawings and photos of Belleville Transit buses

Transport in Belleville, Ontario
Transit agencies in Ontario